Kapustin and Kapustina (feminine) is a common Russian surname. It is derived from the sobriquet "капуста" (cabbage).  Notable people with the surname include:

 Anton Kapustin (born 1971), professor of theoretical physics at Caltech
 Archimandrite Antonin (Kapustin), 19th-century head of the Russian Ecclesiastical Mission in Jerusalem
 Denis Kapustin (born 1970), Russian triple jumper
 Nikolai Kapustin (1937–2020), Soviet pianist and composer
 Nikolai Kapustin (mathematician) (born 1957), Russian mathematician
 Sergei Kapustin (1953–1995), Soviet ice hockey player

See also
Kapustin Yar, a rocket launch and development site in Russia

Russian-language surnames